"You're Out Doing What I'm Here Doing Without" is a song written by Allen Frizzell and Bo Roberts, and recorded by American country music artist Gene Watson.  It was released in March 1983 as the first single from the album Sometimes I Get Lucky.  The song reached #2 on the Billboard Hot Country Singles & Tracks chart.

Charts

Weekly charts

Year-end charts

References

1983 singles
1983 songs
Gene Watson songs
MCA Records singles